Heinrich Schlier (Neuburg an der Donau on the Danube, 31 March 1900 – Bonn, 26 December 1978) was a theologian, initially with the Evangelical Church and later with the Catholic Church.

Biography 

Schlier was the son of a military doctor and attended the High School-Gymnasium in Landau and Ingolstadt, participated in World War I, and in 1919 studied Evangelical Theology at the University of Marburg, Leipzig and Jena. From 1927, he  served as pastor and teacher of the New Testament in  Halle, Saxony-Anhalt  and Wuppertal. From 1935, Schlier was part of the Confessing Church (German: Bekennende Kirche, BK), an opposition movement which arose in the Evangelical German Church against the attempt of the German Nazi regime to align the teaching and organisation of the Evangelical Church to Nazism. After the closing of the seminary in Wuppertal, he became pastor of the local community of the Confessing Church.
 
After the end of World War II, Schlier was again called to the Chair of New Testament and the Early History of Christianity at the Theological Faculty of Bonn University. Over the years, however, he increasingly moved away from Protestantism, since he concluded that the Ecclesiological paradigms of the New Testament are anchored in the clearest way to Roman Catholicism. Consequently, Schlier in 1952 took a sabbatical, and, a year later, he converted to Catholicism. Concurrently he converted his pupil Uta Ranke-Heinemann, and in 1954 obtained a degree in Catholic theology at Munich.
 
Schlier was unable to obtain a professorship at the Faculty of Catholic Theology, since this was then reserved only for consecrated priests. Instead he became an Honorary Professor at the Faculty of Philosophy of the University of Bonn and was an active theological writer. Pope Paul VI called him to be in the Pontifical Biblical Commission. Pope Benedict XVI knew him and admired the subject's blending of scholarship and spirituality.
 
In addition, Schlier participated in the preparation of an official translation of the Bible and published it together with the Jesuit theologian Karl Rahner as series Quaestiones sentences. Schlier is counted among the leading scholars of the New Testament of the 20th century.

References

http://www.30giorni.it/articoli_id_19828_l3.htm...

External links 
 Opere di e su Heinrich Schlier nel Catalogo della Biblioteca Nazionale Tedesca

1900 births
1978 deaths
German Christian theologians
20th-century German theologians
German Roman Catholics
Converts to Roman Catholicism from Lutheranism
German male non-fiction writers
People from Neuburg an der Donau
Roman Catholic biblical scholars
20th-century American Roman Catholic theologians
Pontifical Biblical Commission